Ectodysplasin A receptor (EDAR) is a protein that in humans is encoded by the EDAR gene. EDAR is a cell surface receptor for ectodysplasin A which plays an important role in the development of ectodermal tissues such as the skin. It is structurally related to members of the TNF receptor superfamily.

Function 
EDAR and other genes provide instructions for making proteins that work together during embryonic development. These proteins form part of a signaling pathway that is critical for the interaction between two cell layers, the ectoderm and the mesoderm. In the early embryo, these cell layers form the basis for many of the body's organs and tissues. Ectoderm-mesoderm interactions are essential for the proper formation of several structures that arise from the ectoderm, including the skin, hair, nails, teeth, and sweat glands.

Clinical significance 
Mutation in this gene have been associated with hypohidrotic ectodermal dysplasia, a disorder characterized by a lower density of sweat glands.

Derived EDAR allele 
A derived G-allele point mutation (SNP) with pleiotropic effects in EDAR, 370A or rs3827760, found in ancient and modern East Asians, Southeast Asians, Nepalese and Native Americans but not common in African or European populations, is thought to be one of the key genes responsible for a number of differences between these populations, including the thicker hair, more numerous sweat glands, smaller breasts, and the Sinodont dentition (so-called shovel incisors) characteristic of East Asians. 

A 2013 study suggested that the EDAR variant (370A) arose about 35,000 years ago in central China, period during which the region was then quite warm and humid. However a more recent study from 2021, based on ancient DNA samples, has suggested that the derived variant actually arose shortly after the Last Glacial Maximum in Northeast Asia, around 19,000 years ago. All ancient East Asian remains after the LGM have the derived EDAR allele.

It has been hypothesized that natural selection favored this allele during the last ice age in a population of people living in isolation in Beringia, as it may play a role in the synthesis of breast milk under Vitamin D-poor conditions. One study suggested that because the EDAR mutation arose in a cool and dry environment, it may have been adaptive by increasing skin lubrication, thus reducing dryness in exposed facial structures.

The 370A mutation is found in 60-90% of Han Chinese and in the majority of people in nearby Asian populations of very specific demographic haplogroups. This mutation is also implicated in ear morphology differences and reduced chin protrusion. The derived G-allele is a variation of the A-allele in earlier hominids, the version found in most modern non-East Asian and non-Native American populations and is found in 100% of Native American skeletal remains within all Native American haplogroups which studies have been done on prior to all contract for foreign population from Africa, Europe, or Asia. The derived allele was present in both the Tibeto-Burman (Magar and Newar) and Indo-European (Brahmin) populations of Nepal. The highest 1540C allele frequency was observed in Magar (71%), followed by Newar (30%) and Brahmin (20%).

Derived variants of EDAR are associated with multiple facial and dental characteristics.

In a 2015 study, three (of six) ancient DNA samples (7,900-7,500 BP) from Motala, Sweden; two (3300–3000 BC) from the Afanasevo culture and one (400–200 BC) Scythian sample were found to carry the rs3827760 mutation.

In a 2018 study, several ancient DNA samples from the Americas, including USR1 from the Upward Sun River site, Anzick-1, and the 9,600 BP individual from Lapa do Santo, were found to not carry the derived allele. This suggests that the increased frequency of the derived allele occurred independently in both East Asia and the Americas.

See also 
Ectodysplasin A2 receptor

References

Further reading

External links 
 GeneReview/NIH/UW entry on Hypohidrotic Ectodermal Dysplasia

Proteins
Cell-surface receptors
Ectoderm
TNF receptor family